Greenwich Entertainment, founded in 2017, is an independent film distribution company specializing in distinctive, theatrical-quality narrative and documentary features. The company released Jimmy Chin and Chai Vasarhelyi’s Academy Award-Winning Documentary Free Solo, which grossed over $17M at the US box office, Andrew Slater’s Echo in the Canyon, which opened to the highest per-theater-average of any documentary in 2019, and Linda Ronstadt: The Sound of My Voice by Academy Award-winning directors Rob Epstein and Jeffrey Friedman.  

Greenwich is led by a management team that has overseen more than 150 theatrical releases generating over $100 million at the US box office, garnering multiple Academy Award nominations and 2 Academy Award wins.

Filmography

References

2017 establishments in New York City
Film distributors of the United States